Waddington Historic District is a national historic district located at Waddington in St. Lawrence County, New York.  The district includes 11 contributing buildings.  They include the St. Paul's Episcopal Church (1816), Town Hall (1884), Hepburn Library (1919), and homes dating back to the 1820s.

It was listed on the National Register of Historic Places in 1992.

Gallery

References

Historic districts on the National Register of Historic Places in New York (state)
Historic districts in St. Lawrence County, New York
National Register of Historic Places in St. Lawrence County, New York